The Shire of Korumburra was a local government area located about  southeast of Melbourne, the state capital of Victoria, Australia.

History

Originally part of the Shire of Buln Buln, Korumburra was first incorporated as the Shire of Poowong and Jeetho on 29 May 1891. Its boundaries were initially fairly flexible, as it annexed parts of the Warragul and Woorayl Shires, settling on its final boundaries by 1912. It was renamed Korumburra on 25 October 1922.

On 2 December 1994, the Shire of Korumburra was abolished, and along with the Shires of Mirboo and South Gippsland, and parts of the Shire of Woorayl, was merged into the new South Gippsland Shire. The Wattle Bank, Lance Creek and Lang Lang South districts in the west were transferred into the newly created Bass Coast Shire.

Wards

The Shire of Korumburra was divided into three ridings, each of which elected three councillors:
 North Riding
 Central Riding
 South Riding

Towns and localities
 Arawata
 Bena
 Ellerside
 Jeetho
 Jumbunna
 Kardella
 Kongwak
 Korumburra*
 Loch
 Nyora
 Outtrim
 Poowong
 Ranceby
 Strzelecki
 Whitelaw

* Council seat.

Population

* Estimate in the 1958 Victorian Year Book.

References

External links
 Victorian Places - Korumburra Shire

Korumburra